Once Upon a Time is a 1918 British silent romance film directed by Thomas Bentley and starring Lauri de Frece, Manora Thew and Dorothy Minto. The screenplay concerns a love affair that develops between a comedian and a clown's daughter.

Premise
Over the years a love affair slowly develops between a comedian and a clown's daughter.

Cast
 Lauri de Frece as Sam Dunn
 Manora Thew as Sally Drury
 Dorothy Minto as Lottie Price
 Nelson Keys as Harry Gwynne
 Joan Legge as Mary Gwynne
 A. E. Matthews as Guy Travers
 Noel Fisher as Eustace Travers
 Frederick Volpe as Mr. Goodheart
 Charles Macdona as Dr. Brown
 Adelaide Grace as Mrs. Gwynne
 Jeff Barlow as Ned Drury
 Kenelm Foss as Charles Dickens

Bibliography
 Low, Rachael. History of the British Film, 1914-1918. Routledge, 2005.

External links

1918 films
1918 romantic drama films
British romantic drama films
1910s English-language films
Films directed by Thomas Bentley
British silent feature films
British black-and-white films
1910s British films
Silent romantic drama films